Jubin Nautiyal (born 14 June 1989) is an Indian playback singer and live performer. In June 2022, he won the IIFA award for “Playback Singer (Male)” for the song “Raataan Lambiyan.” He was awarded Upcoming Male Vocalist of the Year at 8th Mirchi Music Awards for his song "Zindagi Kuch Toh Bata (Reprise)" from Bajrangi Bhaijaan. He also won the Rising Musical Star Award at Zee Business Awards. He has since recorded songs for films in various Indian languages, predominantly Hindi. He is signed on by T-Series.

Early life
Jubin Nautiyal was born on 14 June 1989 in Dehradun. His father, Ram Sharan Nautiyal, is a businessman and politician in Uttarakhand and his mother, Neena Nautiyal, is a businesswoman. He showed an inclination towards music at an early age of four, taking after his father's love for singing. He did his schooling up to eighth grade from St. Joseph's Academy, Dehradun. Thereafter, he continued his schooling at Welham Boys' School, Dehradun, where he formally studied music as a subject and built a base in classical music. He also learnt playing instruments like guitar, piano, harmonium, and drums. By the age of 18, Nautiyal was well known as a singer in his hometown of Dehradun. He performed live at many events and donated to charities.

After completing his schooling, he moved to Mumbai in 2007 and joined Mithibai College. He continued to train in music (under Pandit Chhannulal Mishra in Varanasi) and ventured into Bollywood. During this time he met A.R. Rahman who appreciated his voice quality and suggested that he continue to work and explore his voice for a few more years before entering into the Indian Music Industry. Taking Rahman's advice, Nautiyal moved back to his hometown and continued to train under his schoolteacher, Mrs. Vandana Srivastava. He also took additional music lessons in the Hindustani classical music from his Guru Mr Samant. He spent four years polishing his skills in music, traveling and playing with different musicians, and traveled to Benaras to learn light classical from Chhannulal Mishra. He also took training in western music at a music academy in Chennai where he had the opportunity to study under veteran guitarist Prasanna.

Career
Main article: List of songs recorded by Jubin Nautiyal

In 2011, Nautiyal participated in the television music reality show X Factor where he went up to being in the top 25 participants.

He made his debut in the Indian music industry with the song "Ek Mulakat" from the film Sonali Cable (2014). He also sang 'Meherbani' for The Shaukeens in the same year. In 2015, he sang 'Zindagi' for Bajrangi Bhaijaan, 'Bandeyaa' for Jazbaa, 'Tu Itni Khoobsurat Hain Reloaded' for Barkhaa and 'Samandar' with Shreya Ghoshal for Kis Kisko Pyaar Karoon.

He made his Telugu debut for Sarrainodu under the music direction of S. Thaman and Bengali debut in the movie Aashiqui.

In 2016, Nautiyal performed on MTV Unplugged Season 5 and sang Dahleez's track "Jiya Re". He worked with composer duo Sachin–Jigar for the title track of series Ek Duje Ke Vaaste and Amit Trivedi for the film Fitoor where he lent his voice for "Tere Liye" along with Sunidhi Chauhan. He also worked with composer Nadeem Saifi for the title track of Ishq Forever and also sang two songs for Kuch Kuch Locha Hai under them. He also collaborated with JAM8's Kaushik and Akash for "Gumnaam Hai Koi" for the film 1920 London. His songs "Le Chala" for One Night Stand and "The Sound of Raaz" and "Yaad Hai Na (Reprise)" for Raaz Reboot gave him an opportunity to work with composer Jeet Gannguli and this collaboration continued till "Dhal Jaun Main" for Rustom.

In 2017, he was the lead singer for the film Kaabil which had music by Rajesh Roshan, and also sang "The Humma Song" for Dharma Productions's film Ok Jaanu. He released a Hindi pop song along with Pawni Pandey named 'Dil Budhhu' on T-Series He sang for Raabta, Tubelight, Commando 2, and Machine. He sang 'Banwra Mann' for Jolly LLB 2, 'Socha Hai' Remake for Baadshaho and 'Raat Baaki' Remake for Ittefaq. He also sang the title track of Star Plus series Tu Sooraj, Main Saanjh Piyaji with Palak Muchhal and for Star Parivaar Awards 2017. In 2018, he sang 'Gazab Ka Hai Din Remake' with Prakriti Kakar for Dil Juunglee, and 'Boond Boond' with Neeti Mohan for the film Hate Story 4. For the same film, he also sang 'Tum Mere Ho' with Amrita Singh under Mithoon's composition. This was also his first collaboration with Mithoon following Baaghi 2. He also sang 'Pehla Nasha Once Again' with Palak Muchhal for Kuchh Bheege Alfaaz.

In 2019, his songs 'Tujhe Kitna Chahein Aur Hum' from Kabir Singh, "Tum Hi Aana" and "Kinna Sona" from Marjaavaan became chartbusters.

Nautiyal and music composer Mithoon teamed up again for 'Toh Aagaye Hum'. He also released a new song 'Main Jis Din Bhula Du' along with Tulsi Kumar. In 2021, his new song ''Lut Gaye'' featuring Emraan Hashmi and Yukti Thareja hit more than 915 million views on YouTube. His next song "Bedardi Se Pyaar Ka" hit 55 Million Views in just 13 days. This music of Tanishk Bagchi is sung by Nautiyal and Asees Kaur was published by T-Series.  Nautiyal's next song, "Barsaat Ki Dhun", was released on 20 July 2021 featuring Karishma Sharma and Gurumeet Choudhary in the music video.

In January 2022, his song "O Aasamanwale" was released by T-Series. It was an album of a musical love song in which Nautiyal was onscreen with the artist Neha Khan. The song was written by Manoj Muntashir and composed by Rochak Kohli.

On 1 February 2022, "Tumse Pyaar Karke" was released by T-Series featuring Gurmeet Choudhary and Ihana Dhillon. This is the music of Payal Dev and sung by Tulsi Kumar and Nautiyal.

He also sang "Manike" with Yohani in 2022 for the comedy film "Thank God", which was released on 25 October 2022.

Awards and nominations

See also
 List of Indian playback singers

References

External links

 

Bollywood playback singers
Musicians from Dehradun
Living people
1989 births
Indian male playback singers
Mithibai College alumni
Singers from Uttar Pradesh
21st-century Indian singers
21st-century Indian male singers